Aşir Atlı (1881; Kilis - October 23, 1957; Istanbul) was an officer of the Ottoman Army and a general of the Turkish Army.

See also
List of high-ranking commanders of the Turkish War of Independence

Sources

External links

1881 births
1957 deaths
People from Kilis
Ottoman Military Academy alumni
Ottoman Military College alumni
Ottoman Army officers
Ottoman military personnel of the Italo-Turkish War
Ottoman military personnel of the Balkan Wars
Ottoman military personnel of World War I
Turkish military personnel of the Greco-Turkish War (1919–1922)
Members of Kuva-yi Milliye
Turkish Army generals
Deputies of Bursa
Republican People's Party (Turkey) politicians
Recipients of the Medal of Independence with Red Ribbon (Turkey)
Burials at Turkish State Cemetery
Deputies of Kütahya
Deputies of Gaziantep
Governors of Antalya